Joseph Frear may refer to:

 J. Allen Frear Jr. (1903–1993), American businessman and politician
 Joseph Frear (builder) (1846–1926), New Zealand builder and businessman